The Unspeakable Vault (of Doom) or Weird Tales from the Old Ones is a webcomic by François Launet, which chronicles the "daily" lives of the Great Old Ones, including Cthulhu, Nyarlathotep, and Yog-Sothoth, among others. It takes a lighthearted view of H. P. Lovecraft's Cthulhu Mythos to inspire laughter rather than the more usual soul-blasting horror. The comic was used as the basis of the second expansion set to the Cthulhu Mythos themed version of Steve Jackson Games' card game Munchkin.

The webcomic's name is often shortened to UVoD.

Origin
In 2003 the Essen Game Fair in Germany, the author, who was there signing books for the Pegasus Spiele game publisher (as illustrator of the German Call of Cthulhu RPG), witnessed the craziness about Cthulhu plushes, sold on different booths: many old players of the Call of Cthulhu role-playing games wanted to buy this icon of the Lovecraftian Mythos. On the train that took him back to Paris, he started drawing the first funny Cthulhoo and Nyarly draft, along with a few layout of strips. Characters were designed in a very cartoonish style, with simplified features and layout, that contrast strongly with the author's illustrations style, more realistic and classical.

The name of the webcomic comes from the juxtaposition of a very Lovecraftian adjective "unspeakable" with the name "Vault", a Lovecraft's short story title. "of Doom" was used by the author's role-playing team to describe threatening spells or items.

Although its author is French, the webcomic is written directly in English, to be able to reach the largest audience, and because the English language is more direct and uses fewer words; this sometimes leads to grammatical or syntactical errors in the strips, which are often corrected by emails from native English-speaking readers.

The webcomic
Presented in different formats (mostly 1- or 3-frame strips, sometimes more), short gags are published irregularly on the website, and are named "Vault #" followed by a number, since its creation in January 2004. Strips are independent, though some gags are running on a few linked pages. Some strips refer to previously published gags, and can be difficult to understand for newcomers.

The characters' appearance has changed a bit since 2004, becoming more precise and balanced, but some recently published strips shows old-looking creatures: the strips are not published in a rigorous chronological order, and sometimes a gag is taken from the book Welcome to the Vault.

The webcomic uses the Cthulhu Mythos and its caricatured characters in a modern environment, referring to the common popular culture and actuality, and even politics; ecological matters can also be seen through a few strips dealing with pollution and overfishing.

The vision of the Cthulhu Mythos in the comic is heavily influenced by the Call of Cthulhu role-playing game; François Launet discovered HPL's works through gaming, and many strips directly refers to the game, its rules, its accessories and the players' habits.

The website also features a weblog, used to talk about Mythos-related events or item, a guest art section to display drawings done by fans and a small shop selling T-shirts.

The website is hosted by Macguff Paris, a special FX and post-production company, which employs François Launet as a SFX supervisor, and allows him to use some of their disk space and broadband access.

The printed books
In 2005, François Launet and Pegasus Spiele agreed on the publication of a printed version of the UvoD, under the supervision of JC.Steines, and Paul McLean from yog-sothoth.com for the editing part. Featuring most of the strips published at that time on the web, along with original gags, Welcome to the Vault was a 105-page, comic-sized book, printed in an edition of 4000 copies and sold on the US by White Wolf and Chaosium. The books were not officially distributed in Europe and are, therefore, very difficult to find.

A second tome, G.O.O.s on the Loose was published in 2008, featuring a lot of new characters, such as Cthoogha, the Elderz or Beta Red Agents.

Mythos-related characters
Most of the characters in the comic are given names slightly different from their counterparts in the Cthulhu Mythos.

(Great) Cthulhoo
Cthulhoo (Cthulhu) is a large, green, dragon-like creature with huge claws on his feet, beady eyes, tiny arms, almost vestigial wings (still capable of flight), and a large, bulbous head with tiny tentacles in place of a mouth. His catchphrase is "Yum yum," usually uttered before devouring some hapless human.  Apparently, the whole point of black magic is to feed Cthulhoo, since he usually eats anyone who, deliberately or accidentally, summons him.  Cthulhoo also commonly uses the phrase "Fhtagn!", in the manner of an expletive. If "Fhtagn" is mispronounced as "FTHagn," Cthulhoo comes anyway, but lectures the summoner on how to say the word - before eating him (or her).

Nyarly
Nyarly (Nyarlathotep) is what appears to be a tentacle with a pair of beady eyes, a single large tooth sticking out of his mouth, and short arms and legs. He has a deceptive and cunning personality and enjoys playing tricks on the other GOOs and cultists. Unlike the other Great Old Ones, Nyarly appears to use much more "advanced" means of conquering or instilling madness, such as spam and weapons of mass destruction. Unlike his more frightening counterpart, who actually shapeshifts, Nyarly often dons an incredibly stupid costume such as a mask or a few simple costume pieces.

Shubby

Shubby (Shub-Niggurath) is a bizarre, pulpy purple creature with a pair of goat-like legs, stubby arms, horns, and what could either be three eyes or two eyes and a nose. Although Shubby is rarely seen being involved in human matters, her cult is often referred to. Strangely enough, Shubby is one of the few Great Old Ones that has yet to be summoned.  In guest art created by fans of the strip, she is sometimes depicted instead as a (vaguely anime-styled) anthropomorphic black female goat, a reference to Shub-Niggurath's title "the Black Goat of the Woods with a Thousand Young".  She can usually be seen with several of her thousand identical offspring tagging along.

Yogzotot
Yogzotot (Yog-Sothoth), The Gate and the Key, is what appears to be a conglomeration of glowing, colorful bubbles. Since he is the master of Time and Space, Yogzotot is capable of sending anyone or anything to another place, time, or even dimension. Apparently, Yogzotot is very touchy about people mistaking him for soap and usually reacts to the insult by zapping said person.

Ygo
Ygo (Y'golonac) is a large, bluish, humanoid creature with no head, a beer gut, and a mouth on each hand. He appears to have a hearty but weird sense of 
humor which no one can understand. 
Like Shubby, he, too, has not yet been summoned, but unlike Shubby, he is one of the few GOOs whose cult has not even been seen yet.

Shoggies
The Shoggies (Shoggoths) are pink, gelatinous creatures with random assortments of eyes, teeth, and tongues. They have no brains and are very dim-witted. They are common throughout the webcomic, perhaps more so than any other character. They address any of the GOOs as either "Master" or, in the case of Shubby, "Mastress". Shoggies are the only characters other than Yogzotot and Cthulhoo to have a catchphrase - "So coool!"

Dagoon
Dagoon (Dagon) is a giant fish-like creature with bulgy, unfocused eyes, fishy lips, and wet scaly skin. He always carries a large monolith, routinely dropping it on victims to crush them (often for no visible reason). Dagoon is worshiped by the Deepoines. It is unclear how he answers their prayers since he never speaks. He often accompanies Cthulhoo during strips set underwater, and appears to be on good terms with him.

'Zatoth
'Zatoth (Azathoth) is a huge white snouted star-shaped creature with misshapen eyes and a large, red tongue, which often hangs out of his mouth. He is called the "Blind Idiot God" as he is unable to speak. His vocabulary consists of a bellowed "G!" (pronounced "Guh!"). He is extremely powerful but also extremely stupid.
He is sometimes found surrounded by flute and drum playing servitors. Apparently 'Zatoth is responsible for most of the cosmic phenomena humanity has witnessed. Nebulæ are 'Zatoth's flatulence, black holes are the damage caused when he bounces on the fabric of time and space, His constant bleating creates the cosmic background noise meteorites are the crumbs left behind when he eats a celestial body. Supernovas occur when he accidentally pops a star while playing with it. Pulsars are caused when he swings stars around.

The Unspeakable (Hast..)
Hast.. (Hastur) is a tentacled monster of some sort who is shrouded in a yellow "king" mask and robes. He carries the Yellow Sign and speaks in an elaborate, medieval-looking font, using archaic turns of phrase such as "I hight..." (meaning "My name is..."). The running "gag" is what happens when anybody, even a Great Old One, says his name.  (This is based not on literary Mythos lore but on a recurring "joke" in Call of Cthulhu games, where disaster strikes anyone daring to name "the Unspeakable"

Tindaloo
Tindaloo (or the Tindaloos) (Hounds of Tindalos) is an emaciated, dog-like creature capable of passing through time and space. He does not like curves, something of an inside joke. In Frank Belknap Long's story "The Hounds of Tindalos" they were said to inhabit the angles of time. Other creatures such as humans inhabit the curves. As seen in strip 266, there are several Tindaloos. It is however unclear whether he is a GOO in his own right. He is usually treated as the GOOs' family pet.

Mi-Goos
The Mi-Goos (Mi-go) are strange insectoid entities with pulpy feeler-covered faces and leathery, bat-like wings. They have had several notable appearances in strips focused on them, and are referred to many times. They collect brains of scientists, such as described in the short story "The Whisperer in Darkness". They appear to speak a different language than the other characters in the comic, and their speech is translated for the reader on the bottom of the panel whenever they talk.

Deepoines
The Deepoines (Deep Ones) are bizarre, frog-like creatures with skinny wet bodies, bulgy unfocused eyes, and fishy lips, much like their deity Dagoon. They speak with a bizarre accent. Deepoine/human hybrids are easy to spot as they have the same traits. They may also carry a fishy scent.

Cthoogha
As a ball of fire with red eyes, surrounded by smaller flying fires with teeth (the fire vampires),  Cthoogha (Cthugha) can be summoned when Fomalhaut is up in the sky. This goddess seems to love rock'n roll and to burn her own cultists and is said to be responsible for the great fires of Rome or London in the past, as well as the Tunguska incident. Cthoogha appears in the G.O.Os on the Loose book, and has become the newest character of the webcomic version.

The Elderz
The Elderz (Elder Things) have barrel-shaped bodies and star-shape red heads, with one unique eye, and strange appendices of unknown function. Living under the sea, they appear in the G.O.Os on the Loose book; they are responsible for the creation of the Shoggies (an expired dehydrated soup). even though it suggested they were created by Cthulhoo and pals.

Night Gaunts
Night Gaunts (Nightgaunts) are flying horned purple humanoids that delight in carrying people off.

Human characters
Human characters are often drawn faceless, to illustrate the "insect" status of the human race, compared to the Elder Gods and Creatures described by Lovecraft.

Cultists
Wearing long red or violet robes and jewelry, they try to summon and control the Great Old Ones, using ancient books and more modern tools such as printers or the Internet. They generally are eaten by the invoked creatures.

Investigators
Usually depicted as people dressed in the fashion style of the 1920s, and look like Indiana Jones or Dick Tracy. They often are armed with Tommy-guns or other weapons that were common in the 20s-30s.

Scientists
Often described as arrogant and self-sufficient, scientists of the UVoD are often featured making erroneous deductions from strange facts, and also victims of the creature from beyond. They often use the sentence: "My conclusion is simple yet brilliant". They are often victims of marauding Mi-Goos. The author is very interested in science vulgarization and tries to stick to the scientific actuality.

Geeks
Other victims of the Great Old Ones, geeks use computers and the Internet, and willingly or not, summon supernatural creatures. In the G.O.O.s on the Loose book, a small story arc describes how three geeks become very bad cultists.

Role players
Shown around the game table or "in-game" (with their alter-ego: the "investigators"), they can also be victims of the Gods, but most of time are just bad at role-playing, making all the known "mistakes" in a Call of Cthulhu session.

Beta Red Agents
Direct reference to the Delta Green Supplement, those men-in-black are working for an unofficial agency designed to fight the Mythos critters: Beta Red. The name was changed to avoid copyright problems, as Pagan Publishing continues to work on Delta Green.

Erich Zann
A musician, center of the short story "The Music of Erich Zann." In the webcomic, he plays music that pleases the Old Ones, all the while believing that it keeps them away.

Mad Abdul
Caricature of Abdul Alhazred, author of the infamous Necronomicon, Mad Abdul is portrayed as a boring, chatty Arabic beggar, always wanting to preach the surrounding crowd about the Old Ones. He is often ripped apart by an invisible force, like in Lovecraft's "History of the Necronomicon". Mad Abdul makes two appearances in the webcomic but is more important in the UVoD volume 2 book.

Musicians
According to the musical tastes of the author, Metal and Gothic band members are shown overusing Mythos imagery in their lyrics, with disastrous consequences. When he eats them, Cthulhoo does not like the excessive amount of hair they have.

Discworlders

Several strips reference the famous books by Terry Pratchett in various ways; characters included on occasion have included Rincewind (along with Twoflower's animate "Luggage"), the Grim Reaper (who falls afoul of Lovecraft's line "With strange aeons, even Death may die"), and even Sir Terry himself, who is one of several influential artists to be eulogized in the UVOD.

Appearances in popular culture
Recent editions of the Munchkin card game by Steve Jackson Games have included Lovecraftian characters; in January 2008, an edition with 56 Unspeakable Vault character cards was added to the collection.

In October 2008 PS Games released the Dutch translation of Munchkin Cthulhu, as Munchkin Koethuloo, which includes an extra card featuring the Tindaloos.

Pegasus Press has produced a board game based around the comic.

In 2006, futurist Anders Sandberg noted the Unspeakable Vault (of Doom) as an example of the trend of poking fun at formerly horrifying concepts.

References

External links

Unspeakable Vault (of Doom) website
Munchkin Cthulhu 3 - The Unspeakable Vault
Article on Yog-Sothoth.com review
Review of issue #3 of the paper version

Cthulhu Mythos comics
Parody webcomics
2000s webcomics
2003 webcomic debuts
German comedy websites
German webcomics